This is a list of notable people who belong to an ethnic Tuluva community and who natively speak Tulu language.

Rulers

 Krishnadevaraya
 Viranarasimha Raya
 Tuluva Narasa Nayaka
 Achyuta Deva Raya
 Sadasiva Raya
 Venkata I
 Ravivarma Narasimha Domba Heggade: Raja of Vitla
 Maipady Venkatesh Varma Raja: Raja of Kumbla
 Abbakka Rani: 16th-century queen of Ullal

Journalists 

 Kayyar Kinhanna Rai: Indian independence activist and a writer of great fame.
 V. T. Rajshekar: founder and editor of the Dalit Voice

 K. K. Shetty freedom fighter (He was the editor of Navayuga for a short period.
 K Honnayya Shetty Editor of Navayuga Kannada weekly from 1929 to 1974 and editor of monthly magazine Antharanga.
  Ishwar Daithota journalist editor of Udayavani, Vijaya KarnaTaka

Judiciary and lawyers

 K.S. Hegde: former Speaker of Lok Sabha; former Judge of the Supreme Court of India
 Nitte Santhosh Hegde: Karnataka Lokayuktha; former Judge of the Supreme Court of India
 Rohini Salian: public prosecutor
 Kalmanje Jagannatha Shetty (1926–2015), former judge, Supreme Court of India

 Kedambadi Jagannath Shetty former Judge of Karnataka High Court

Literature, philosophy, and religion

 Sri Vishwesha Teertharu (Pejavara Shreegalavaru)
 Bannanje Govindacharya: Vedic scholar
 Ratnavarma Heggade
 Veerendra Heggade: philanthropist
 Sri Niranjana: writer 
 M.K.Seetharam Kulal: Tulu-Kannada dramatist, author, poet; Karnataka State Tulu Sahithya Academy Award (2014)
 Muddana: poet
 Kayyar Kinhanna Rai: poet and activist
 Bola Chittaranjan Das Shetty: author

 Ku Shi Haridhas Bhat : writer 
 Sri Madhvacharya 
 Dr Gururaja Bhat : Historian and writer
 B A Prabhakar Rai : writer in Tulu and Kannada( Tulu Sahitya Academy award 2015) 
 Dr B Vivek Rai : writer, researcher
 K Usha P Rai : writer in tulu and Kannada(Karnataka Sahitya Academy award 2020)
 Dr Indira Hegde: writer researcher

Health care

 Belle Monappa Hegde: educationist and surgeon
 Dinker Belle Rai: Indian American vascular surgeon, inventor, athlete and philosopher
 Devi Prasad Shetty: Philanthropist and surgeon

 Kedambadi Sadananda Shekha - Plastic Surgeon Founder of Bangalore Hospital and a writer
 Keambadi Prabhashankar Shekha - Indian American surgeon
 Shantharam Shetty - Orthopaedic surgeon

Politics

 A. Shanker Alva: former Member of Parliament, Mangalore
 K. Nagappa Alva: former Member of Parliament, Rajya Sabha(1970–1976) and Health Minister, Karnataka State (1962–1967)
 Janardhana Poojary:former Union Minister of State for Finance,
 K. Jayaprakash Hegde: former member of parliament
 V. Dhananjay Kumar: former Union Minister
 Manorama Madhwaraj: former Member of Parliament, Udupi; former MLA Udupi
 Lalaji Mendon: MLA, Kaup Vidhansabha
 Veerappa Moily: former Chief Minister of Karnataka, member of the 16th Lok Sabha
 I. Rama Rai: former Member of Parliament, Kasaragod
 D. V. Sadananda Gowda Minister of Chemicals and Fertilizers, former Chief Minister of Karnataka.
 Ramanath Rai: Minister for Forest, Environment and Ecology
 Halady Srinivas Shetty: MLA 2013 assembly for Kundapura, Karnataka
 I. M. Jayarama Shetty: former Member of Parliament, Udupi
 K. K. Shetty: former Member of Parliament, Mangalore
 Suresh Shetty: MLA, Andheri (East), Maharashtra
 A. B. Shetty (1883–1960), politician and philanthropist
 Shobha Karandlaje Member of parliament, Loksabha

Artists

 Prakash Shetty: cartoonist
 R.Verman: art director
 Sudarshan Shetty (born 1961), artist
 Vilas nayak: Asia's fastest painter

Film directors and producers

 Rakshit Shetty
 Raj B Shetty
 Ranjith Bajpe: Indian film director and screenwriter known for his work in Tulu cinema 
 Ramchandra P. N.: filmmaker
 Manmohan Shetty: founder of Adlabs Films
 Rohit Shetty: film director and producer
 Anup Bhandari: film director, music director, lyricist & playback singer

Actors

 Arjun Kapikad
 Anushree
 Aishwarya Rai Bachchan
 Anushka Shetty
 Avanthika Shetty
 Athiya Shetty
 Anup Bhandari
 Aravind Bolar
 Bhojaraj Vamanjoor
 Dayanand Shetty
 Dheekshith Shetty
 Fighter Shetty: 70s Bollywood actor
 Naveen D Padil
 Nirup Bhandari
 Pooja Hegde
 Prakash Raj
 Pruthvi Ambaar
 Raai Laxmi
 Radhika
 Rakshit Shetty: Kannada actor, director
 Rishab Shetty
 Rohit Shetty
 Shamita Shetty
 Shilpa Shetty
 Shubha Poonja
 Srinidhi Shetty: Miss Supranational 2016
 Suman
 Suniel Shetty
 Vinay Rai
 Vinaya Prasad
 Yagna Shetty
 Krithi Shetty
 Shreya Anchan Sidhu

Music

 Sandeep Chowta: music director
 Kadri Gopalnath: saxophonist
 Gurukiran: music director
 Ganesh Hegde: singer, performer, video director and Bollywood choreographer
 Manikanth Kadri: film score and soundtrack composer and singer
 V.Manohar: music director, lyricist, film director and actor
 Vittal Ramamurthy: violinist
 Shweta Shetty: pop singer
 Vidyabhushana: vocalist

Science and technology

Udupi Ramachandra Rao: scientist
Vittal Rai: scientist
Kalidas Shetty: food scientist
Rajini Rao: physiologist

Sports

 Ashwini Akkunji: national level athlete
 Ashish Kumar Ballal: former captain of the Indian Field Hockey team and Arjuna awardee
 Budhi Kunderan: cricketer
 Mamatha Poojary: kabadi player
 Nikhil Poojary: footballer
 Satheesha Rai: Indian weightlifter, Olympian and Arjuna awardee
 Shodhan Rai: international bodybuilder and Ekalavya Award winner
 Vandana Rao: national sprinter, 90s
 Vijith Shetty: Indian football player
 Vikrant Shetty: United Arab Emirates cricketer
 Gundibail Sunderam: cricketer
 Siddhanth Thingalaya: national sprinter
 Chirag Shetty Indian badminton Player
 KL Rahul India cricketer
 Pooja Shri Shetty Indian Karateka
 Vivaswan Shetty 200m indoor national record holder in athletics

Bankers

 U. R. Bhat: director of Karnataka Bank
 A. B. Shetty: founder of Vijaya Bank and prominent politician
 Mulki Sunder Ram Shetty: Chairman of Vijaya Bank
 V. P. Shetty: Chairman of JM Financial Asset Reconstruction Co. Pvt. Ltd., JM Financial Asset Management Co. Pvt. Ltd. and JM Financial Products Ltd.

Business persons

 Muthappa Rai: Indian  businessman
A. B. Shetty (1883–1960), founder of Vijaya Bank
Manmohan Shetty, founder of Adlabs Imagica, India's first & only Theme Park.
Ajit Shetty, is a Belgian businessman. He was chairman of the board of directors of Janssen Pharmaceutica, a pharmaceutical company, with its headquarters in Beerse, Belgium
Mulki Sunder Ram Shetty , Chairman of Vijaya Bank
B. R. Shetty, CMD New Medical Centre, billionaire and Padma Shri awardee
Raj Shetty, founder of Ramee Hotels, a billionaire Hotelier from Dubai,
Devi Shetty, founder of Narayana Health,
R. N. Shetty, CMD RNS Infrastructure and hereditary administrator of Murudeshwara Shiva Temple
Deepak Shetty, chief executive officer and Managing Director JCB India Limited - India and South Asia's largest Construction Equipment Company

B.Govindan, Chairman of Bhima Jewelry Group, Billionaire
 M.Irvathraya, Former Infosys Sales Manager, Founder Of Refersense, CEO of Trryst, Csuite

War heroes

 Dinesh Chandra Bhandary: Vir Chakra awardee

Gallery

References

 
Lists of people by ethnicity
Tulu Nadu